Charoenrat 31 Bridge is a historic bridge was built across the south city moat known as Pak Khlong Talat. It was paired with Chaloem Sawan 58 Bridge, built across the city moat in the north (demolished in 1971 from the construction of the Phra Pinklao Bridge).

King Vajiravudh (Rama VI) gave contribution equal to his age build the bridge for public use, in the occasion of his birthday anniversary in 1910, which was also the first year of his reign. The bridge officially opened in 1911 and named "Charoenrat 31" ("the King prospered 31 years"). It was the first bridge with the name "Charoen" (the following bridge is Charoenrat 32 Bridge in Bobae area). 

The bridge is reinforced concrete bridge with semicircle walls decorated with relief of tigers, symbol of Wild Tiger Corps founded by the King in the same year. Inscription of the bridge's name is surrounded by European floral design. Top of the bridge wall inscribed King Vajiravudh's royal monogram. At two ends of bridge wall are number 31, meaning the King Vajiravudh's age. The bridge is registered a national heritage by the Fine Arts Department since 1975.

Neighbouring places
Pak Khlong Talat
Rajini School & Rajinee Pier (N7)
Sanam Chai MRT Station
Phra Rachawang Police Station

References

1910 establishments in Siam
Bridges in Bangkok
Phra Nakhon district
Registered ancient monuments in Bangkok